DYCL (97.7 FM), broadcasting as Radyo Todo 97.7, is a radio station owned and operated by Todo Media, Inc. The station's studio and transmitter are located along Taft St. (near the Provincial Capitol), Brgy. 3, Roxas City.

Todo Media Stations

References

Radio stations in Capiz
Radio stations established in 2016